L’Escargot may refer to:

L'Escargot (restaurant), a London restaurant
L'Escargot (horse), a race horse
L'Escargot (TV series), a Hong Kong television drama